Asda is a British supermarket chain.

ASDA or Asda may also refer to:

Organisations
 American Stamp Dealers Association, a philatelic society (founded 1914)
 American Student Dental Association, a body for student dentists (founded 1971)
 Australian Soft Drinks Association, a trade group (now Australian Beverages Council)
 Party of Democratic Activity (A-SDA), a Bosnian political party (2008–2021)

Other uses
 Asda Jayanama (born 1949), Thai diplomat
 Asda Story, a 2008 MMORPG video game
 Accelerate-stop distance available to abort an aircraft take-off

See also
Asta, fictional dog in the Thin Man films
Asta (disambiguation)
ADSA (disambiguation)